Mascot Roller Mills, also known as Ressler's Mill, is a historic grist mill complex located at Upper Leacock Township, Lancaster County, Pennsylvania. The complex consists of the mill, miller's house, summer kitchen, and frame barn.  The original section of the mill was built in 1737. The machinery was installed in 1906. It is a three-story, "L"-shaped stone building with a gable roof and cupola.  The house was built in 1855, and is a two-story, gable roofed brick banked building.  The summer kitchen is adjacent to the house is a one-story, brick structure.  The small frame barn dates to the late-19th century.  It is the oldest continuously operating grist mill in Lancaster County.

It was listed on the National Register of Historic Places in 1983.

References

External links

Grinding mills on the National Register of Historic Places in Pennsylvania
Industrial buildings completed in 1737
Buildings and structures in Lancaster County, Pennsylvania
Grinding mills in Pennsylvania
Historic American Engineering Record in Pennsylvania
National Register of Historic Places in Lancaster County, Pennsylvania
1737 establishments in Pennsylvania